ㅑ(ya) is a letter of the Korean hangul alphabet. It is a vowel representing a 'ya' sound. The IPA pronunciation is [jɐ]. 

The Unicode for ㅑ is U+3151.

Stroke order

References

Hangul jamo
Vowel letters